The 2017–18 season is the 130th competitive association football season in India.

National teams

India national football team

2019 AFC Asian Cup qualifiers

Friendlies

Goalscorers
Updated 10 June 2018 after match against Kenya.

Debutants
 Jerry Lalrinzuala against Nepal on 6 June 2017.
 Nikhil Poojari against Mauritius on 19 August 2017.
 Amrinder Singh against Mauritius on 19 August 2017.
 Manvir Singh against Mauritius on 19 August 2017.
 Anirudh Thapa against Saint Kitts and Nevis on 24 August 2017.
 Salam Ranjan Singh against Macau on 10 October 2017.

India national under-23 football team

2018 AFC U-23 Championship qualifiers

Friendlies

India national under-20 football team

2018 AFC U-19 Championship qualifiers

2017 SAFF U-18 Championship

Friendlies

India national under-17 football team

2017 FIFA U-17 World Cup

2018 AFC U-16 Championship qualifiers

2017 SAFF U-15 Championship

AFC competitions

2017 AFC Cup

Inter-zone play-off semi-finals

|}

Inter-zone play-off final

|}

2018 AFC Champions League

Play-off Round

|-
!colspan=3|West Region

|}

2018 AFC Cup

Play-off Round

|-
!colspan=5|South Asia Zone

|}

Preliminary round

|-
!colspan=5|South Asia Zone

|}

Group stage

Group E

Club competitions

Indian Super League

Teams added
 Bengaluru
 Jamshedpur

League table

Results

Bracket

Semi-finals

|}

Final

I-League

Promotion and relegation
Teams promoted
 NEROCA
Teams relegated
 Mumbai

League table

Results table

I-League 2nd Division

Preliminary round

Final round

Indian Women's League

Group stage

Knock-out stage

Super Cup

Club managerial changes
This is a list of changes of managers within Indian league football:

References

 
Football
Football
India
India
Seasons in Indian football